Villa Rivero Municipality or Muela Municipality is the second municipal section of the Punata Province in the Cochabamba Department in Bolivia. Its seat is Villa Rivero.

Cantons 
The municipality consists of only one canton, Villa Rivero Canton. It is identical to the municipality.

Languages 
The languages spoken in the Villa Rivero Municipality are mainly Quechua and Spanish.

See also 
 K'illi K'illi

References 

  Instituto Nacional de Estadistica de Bolivia  (INE)

External links 
 Population data and map of Villa Rivero Municipality

Municipalities of the Cochabamba Department